Messiah were a British techno/acid house duo formed in London in 1988 by members Mark Davies and Ali Ghani.

Biography
Known for their heavy use of sampling quotes from films, melodic female vocals, and aggressive synthesizer lines, the group released two full-length albums and several singles during the 1990s. Two singles reached the top 20 of the UK Singles Chart.

Discography

Albums
 21st Century Jesus (1993, Warner Music UK; American Recordings US)
 Messiah Presents Progenitor (1997, Thirsty Ear)

Singles

References

External links
 Messiah discography at Discogs

English techno music groups
English house music duos
Hardcore techno music groups
Musical groups established in 1988
Some Bizzare Records artists
Thirsty Ear Recordings artists